Mansfield and Sutton Astronomical Society (MSAS) is an amateur astronomical society in the East Midlands of England. It was formed in 1969. It is based at Sherwood Observatory, a 61 cm mirror telescope which it owns and operates. The observatory lies 4 km south west of the centre of Mansfield on one of the highest points in the county of Nottinghamshire.

The society is a member of The Federation of Astronomical Societies.

Aims
The aims of the society are to:
further the interests of Astronomy and related subjects within the local community
introduce the public to the subject of Astronomy
provide a forum for education in Astronomy and observational techniques through a collaboration with the University of Nottingham
provide members with the best observational equipment possible.

Meetings
The society holds monthly members-only lecture meetings at the observatory, along with observing and training evenings for members.

Outreach
The society runs a night school for those who wish to learn about astronomy and the universe. These are usually held at the observatory on Friday evenings.

Funding
MSAS is a registered charity. It is funded through member subscriptions, fund raising events, public open evenings held at the society's Observatory, charitable donations and grants.

Patrons
The patrons of the society are:
 Professor Sir Francis Graham Smith, 13th Astronomer Royal (1982-1990).
 Professor Michael R. Merrifield, School of Physics and Astronomy, University of Nottingham.

See also
 List of astronomical societies

References

External links
 Mansfield and Sutton Astronomical Society  Official website.
 Mansfield & Sutton Astronomical Society Yahoo Distribution Group.
 Federation of Astronomical Societies (FAS).

Amateur astronomy organizations
Ashfield District
British astronomy organisations
Mansfield District
Organisations based in Nottinghamshire
Science and technology in Nottinghamshire